586 AD was a year of the Julian calendar.

586 may also refer to:

Computing
 P5 (microarchitecture) (Pentium, 80586, i586), Intel fifth generation x86 processor architecture, and related:
 Cyrix 5x86
 Nx586, by NexGen, later called AMD 5N86
 AMD K5 (5K86, AM586, 5x86)

Other uses
 586 (number), a number
 Minuscule 586 (Gregory-Aland), manuscript of the New Testament
 Smith & Wesson Model 586, a revolver
 "5 8 6", a song on the album Power, Corruption & Lies by New Order